Wen Lianxing (born April 1968) is a Chinese seismologist and geophysicist. He is a professor at Stony Brook University and the University of Science and Technology of China. He was awarded the James B. Macelwane Medal in 2003 and elected a fellow of the American Geophysical Union.

Biography 
Wen was born in Shanghang, Fujian, China in 1968. He graduated from Shanghang No. 1 High School and was admitted to the University of Science and Technology of China (USTC) in 1983. After graduating in 1988, he studied at the Institute of Geophysics of the Chinese Academy of Sciences, and earned his master's degree in 1991. He later studied in the United States and earned his Ph.D. in geophysics in 1998.

From 1998 to 2000 Wen was a research fellow at the Carnegie Institution for Science in Washington, DC. He has been a faculty member at the Department of Geosciences, Stony Brook University since 2000. In 2010, he became a professor at USTC, while retaining his position at Stony Brook.

In 2003, he received the James B. Macelwane Medal from the American Geophysical Union (AGU) and was elected a fellow of AGU. He is the first Chinese scientist to win the medal, often called the "Nobel Prize" of geological sciences.

In 2018, Wen's team at USTC concluded that Mount Mantap at North Korea's Punggye-ri Nuclear Test Site collapsed after its nuclear weapon testing in September 2017. A similar conclusion was independently reached by the team of Liu Junqing of the China Earthquake Administration.

Major publications 
 Wen, L. and Long, H., High-precision location of North Korea's 2009 nuclear test, Seism. Res. Lett., 81 (1), 26-29, 2010.
 Wen, L., Localized temporal change of the Earth's inner core boundary, Science, 314. no. 5801, pp. 967 – 970, 2006.
 Niu, F. and Wen, L., Hemispherical variations in seismic velocity at the top of the Earth's inner-core, Nature, 410, 1081–1084, 2001.
 Wen, L., Silver, P., James, D. and Kuehnel, R., Seismic evidence for a thermo-chemical boundary layer at the base of the Earth's mantle, Earth Planet. Sci. Lett., 189, 141-153, 2001.
 Wen, L. and Helmberger, D.V., Ultra-low velocity zones near the core-mantle boundary from broadband PKP precursors, Science, 279, 1701–1703, 1998.
 Helmberger, D.V., Wen, L. and Ding, X., Seismic evidence that the source of the Iceland hotspot lies at the core-mantle boundary, Nature, 396, 251-255, 1998.

References

1968 births
Living people
Chinese seismologists
Fellows of the American Geophysical Union
Chinese expatriates in the United States
University of Science and Technology of China alumni
California Institute of Technology alumni
Stony Brook University faculty
Academic staff of the University of Science and Technology of China
Physicists from Fujian
People from Longyan
Educators from Fujian